(Claws of Steel) is a 1951 black-and-white Japanese horror film (J-Horror) directed by Nobuo Adachi for Daiei Films. It was shot in Black and White, Academy ratio full-screen, and was never dubbed in English.  The film was never shown in the United States, and was only available on laserdisc in Japan.

Synopsis 
A meek church worker who was once bitten by an ape on a jungle island in World War II begins to transform into a beast-man whenever he drinks alcohol. He develops a split personality like Jekyll & Hyde, one half adoring a virginal church organist, the other lusting after an immoral showgirl. A friend puts him into his nightclub act, showcasing his weird ability to transform from man to beast so effectively. At the climax, the man reverts entirely to bestial and wrecks a nightclub, taking a pretty showgirl hostage.

Cast 
 Joji Oka
 Sumiko Odaka
 Ryosuke Kagawa
 Shiro Kanemitsu
 Toshiaki Konoe
 Kanji Koshiba
 Shozo Nanbu
 Tatsuo Saitō 
 Chieko Seki
 Kazue Tamaki

References

External links 
 

Japanese horror films
Japanese black-and-white films
1951 films
1951 horror films
1950s Japanese films